Khalid Hussain (born 1969 in Pakistan) is a Norwegian-Pakistani writer and film producer. Hussain moved to Norway, without his parents, in 1975. He came to attention after writing the book Pakkis in 1986. Hussain visits high schools to discuss his writing and life as an immigrant teenager.

Bibliography

Novels
 Pakkis (1986)
 Evil Landscape (1990)

Movies
 Import Eksport (2005)
 Jan Jan Pakistan (1997)
 Dharkan (Heartbeat) (1994)

References

Pakistani writers
Pakistani film producers
Norwegian writers
Norwegian film producers
Living people
1969 births
Pakistani emigrants to Norway